Odo of Beauvais may refer to
Bishop Odo I of Beauvais (died 881)
Bishop Odo II of Beauvais (died 1144)
Bishop Odo III of Beauvais (died 1148)